Mariana Ochoa Loayza is an Ecuadorian historian and writer. She has been the custodian of the Historical Archive of Guayaquil and was a member of the Ecuadorian Academy of Maritime and Fluvial History. Her best-known work is the compilation and analysis of the correspondence of the former President of Ecuador, Vicente Rocafuerte. She has also written about the history of El Oro Province.

Citations

Living people
Date of birth missing (living people)
Place of birth missing (living people)
21st-century Ecuadorian historians
Women historians
Year of birth missing (living people)
21st-century Ecuadorian women writers